Adamusy  is a village in the administrative district of Gmina Turośl, within Kolno County, Podlaskie Voivodeship, in north-eastern Poland.

The village has a population of 43.

References

Adamusy